Club Mix is a two-disc album remixed by British musician/DJ Sonique and released in 2001.

Track listing

Disc one
"Right On Right On" - Silicone Soul
"Guitar Track" (Silicone Soul Dark Room Dub) - Colours
"Mind Made Up" (Robbie Rivera's Dark Dub) - Xtra Large
"Travelling On" (Koma and Bones Remix) - Beber & Tamra
"Slippery Track" (Dano's Pre-Flight Dub) - Mood II Swing
"10 in 01" (Paul Van Dyk's Members Only Mix) - Members of Mayday
"Scram" - Plump DJs
"New Year's Dub" - Musique vs. U2
"Groove No. 1" (Original Solaris Mix) - True Gold
"Can't Take the Feeling" (Fab Club Version) - Acrisio & Romagnoli
"Struggle for Pleasure" (Filterheadz Remix) - Minimalistix
"Black Sun" (Total Eclipse Mix) - Jamie Anderson
"Musak" (Steve Lawler Remix) - Trisco
"Let's Beuk" (Original Mix) - Dulux Connection
"Even More Bounce" - Silvio Ecomo
"Secrets" (Ian Wilkie's C-Bit Dub) - Mutiny UK
"Inner Laugh" (James Holden Remix) - Roland Klinkenberg
"Days Go By" (Lucien Foot Remix) - Dirty Vegas
 "Number 4" (A-Side) - Zero ID
"Tantric" - Tronica
"Café del Mar '98" (Original Three 'N One Mix/It Feels So Good Acappella) - Energy 52 & Sonique

Disc two
"Destiny Calls" (Peak Energy Mix) - JDS
"Storm" (Jan Driver Remix) - Storm
"No Alternative" (Extended Mix) - RBA
"Ancient Myth" - Mac Zimms
"Sound of: Oh Yeah" (Original Mix) - Tomba Vira
"Amber" (Silk Mix) - Natious
"Jingalay" (Praha Instrumental Mix) - Rouge
"Pounds and Pénz" (Alex Flatner Deutsche Mark Remix) - Corvin Dalek
"Innocente" (Falling in Love) (Deep Dish Gladiator Remix) - Delerium & Leigh Nash
"Flypaper" - Mr. Spring
"Control" - Pro-tech
"Flight 643" - Tiësto
"Shine On" (Electrique Boutique Mix) - Scott & Leon
"Prosac" (Marc Manga Remix) - Tomcraft
"Ghosts in the Church" - Body Shock
"Drill" (Original Mix) - Dirt Devils
"Sunrise" (Club Mix) - Ratty

References

Sonique (musician) albums
2001 remix albums
EMI Records remix albums